Porites duerdeni, also called thick or knobby finger coral, is a coral in the family Poritidae endemic to Hawaii.

References

Animals described in 1907
Poritidae
Fauna of Hawaii